Da Granto Farò il Cantanto (Italian for "When I grow up, I'll be a singer") is the third studio album release by Neapolitan parody singer-songwriter Tony Tammaro. The words Granto and Cantanto are written in a wrong way because you may write Grande and Cantante in correct Italian.

Track list 
All tracks written and composed by Tony Tammaro.

 Scalea (1:48)
 Miché (1:51)
 'O Sacchetto (1:44)
 A casa per le sette (2:07)
 Mio fratello fuma scrock (1:28) 
 Samba du gassu (1:44)
 Teorema (2:18) 
 Anni sessanta (5:46)
 Fidanzati in casa (2:32) 
 Al Cafone (1:47) 
 Come (2:38)

1992 albums
Tony Tammaro albums